Philosciidae are a family of woodlice (terrestrial isopod crustaceans). They occur almost everywhere on earth, with most species found in (sub)tropical America, Africa and Oceania, and only a few in the Holarctic.

Genera
This is a list of 123 genera in the family Philosciidae, updated 2018.

References

External links 

 

Woodlice
Crustacean families